Albin Winbo (born 27 October 1997) is a Swedish professional footballer who plays as a midfielder for League of Ireland Premier Division club Cork City. He joined the club in January 2023.

References

1997 births
Living people
Swedish footballers
Association football midfielders
Tvååkers IF players
Varbergs BoIS players
Cork City F.C. players
Ettan Fotboll players
Allsvenskan players
League of Ireland players
Swedish expatriate footballers
Expatriate association footballers in Ireland
Swedish expatriate sportspeople in Ireland
Expatriate association footballers in the Republic of Ireland